WLHM (102.3 FM) is a radio station licensed to Logansport, Indiana, United States.  The station airs a Classic hits format and is currently owned by James Allan Schliemann, through licensee Iron Horse Broadcasting, LLC.

References

External links
WLHM's website

LHM
Classic hits radio stations in the United States